The Highest Tradition is a 1946 documentary film from the U.S. about African American war heroes. It was written and produced by William D. Alexander. It is a World War II era war propaganda film. Fredric March narrates. The film begins with stock footage of the Pearl Harbor it then transitions into profiles of African American war heroes.

Astor Pictures released the 2-reel film in 1946. The film is extant and available online.

References

1946 films
1946 documentary films
American black-and-white films
African-American films
African-American history of the United States military
American World War II propaganda films
United States government films
American documentary films
Astor Pictures films
1940s English-language films